Serhii Nykyforov is a press secretary in the administration of Ukrainian president Volodymyr Zelensky.

Early life
Serhii Nykyforov was born in Kryvyi Rih.

He graduated from the Faculty of Journalism of the Taras Shevchenko National University of Kyiv.

Nykyforov worked as a correspondent of the TV channels First National (2007—2011) and Euronews (2011—2017), and he worked as television presenter of the TV channels Ukraine and Ukraine 24 (2018—2021).

References

External links

 

1986 births
Living people
Mass media people from Kryvyi Rih
Taras Shevchenko National University of Kyiv alumni
Ukrainian journalists
21st-century journalists
Press Secretaries of the President of Ukraine